Papyrus Anastasi I (officially designated papyrus British Museum 10247) is an ancient Egyptian papyrus containing a satirical text used for the training of scribes during the Ramesside Period (i.e. Nineteenth and Twentieth dynasties). One scribe, an army scribe, Hori, writes to his fellow scribe, Amenemope, in such a way as to ridicule the irresponsible and second-rate nature of Amenemope's work. The papyrus was originally purchased from  Giovanni Anastasi in 1839.

Content and importance to modern scholarship
The letter gives examples of what a scribe was supposed to be able to do: calculating the number of rations which have to be doled out to a certain number of soldiers digging a lake or the quantity of bricks needed to erect a ramp of given dimensions, assessing the number of men needed to move an obelisk or erect a statue, and organizing the supply of provisions for an army. In a long section Hori discusses the geography of the Mediterranean coast as far north as the Lebanon and the troubles which might beset a traveller there.

This papyrus is important to historians and Bible scholars above all for the information it supplies about towns in Syria and Canaan during the New Kingdom. There is a long list of towns which run along the northern border of the djadi or watershed of the Jordan in Canaan, which bound Lebanon along the Litani River and upper retnu and Syria along the Orontes. The border lands of Egypt's province of Caanan with Kadesh are defined in the Gardiner translation p. 19.

An example of the satire in the text
Hori goes on to show that Amenemope is not skilled in the role of a maher. The word maher is discussed in Gardiner's Egyptian Grammar under "Messenger" and can be found on the inscription of the battle of Kadesh above the head of one such Mariannu scout.

Hori then relates what appears to be an actual anecdote for which Amenemope is apparently infamous. It contains a lot of detail reflecting discreditably on his name and comparing him to Qedjerdi, the chief of Isser. This touches on the concept of gossip amongst the scribes for which the idiom is "Much in the mouths of."

The composition of the satirical interchange between the scribes comes across as quite well written especially where Hori describes Amenemope as incompetent toward the end, giving as an example his poor management of not just his chariot but his character. Amenemope gets ambushed in a mountain pass, possibly at a battle in the campaigns against Kadesh, which go on throughout the 18th and 19th dynasties.

Hori makes clear that these involve routes that should be well known to the scribes operating as mahers or messengers and scouts in the battles. Illustrations from the Battle of Kadesh provide an excellent background for Hori's tale showing the form of the chariots, and the size of the Shashu.

Hori sets this up as an incident in which the incompetence, inexperience and fear of Amenemope results in the wreck of his chariot and the panicked cutting off his hand with a knife while trying to cut loose his horse from the wreck of his chariot.

Amenemope's lack of experience causes him not to be apprehensive when he should be and then panicking when he should remain calm.

Hori piles on the results of Amenemope's inexperience and lack of expertise to show his state of mind clearly, including the part where he releases his pain and fear by forcing his way to the maiden who keeps watch over the gardens when he reaches Joppa.

Amenmope's chariot is on a narrow mountain pass above a ravine in which some four or five cubit (seven foot) tall Shashu are lurking. The road is rough and tangled with vegetation and the Shashu look dangerous and fierce. Amenmope wrecks his rig and has to cut it loose with a knife from some trees it is tangled up in. He cuts himself trying to get the traces free of the branches. "His self abuse is much in the mouths of his followers," the scribe Hori says.

See also
 List of ancient Egyptian papyri
 Ancient Egyptian literature

References
Alan H. Gardiner Egyptian Hieratic Texts - Series I: Literary Texts of the New Kingdom, Part I, Leipzig 1911
K. A. Kitchen, Ramesside Inscriptions, Blackwell 2000
Stephen Fryer hieratic language instruction

External links
Gardiner's translation of Papyrus Anastasi I

Extra-biblical references to Canaan
Satirical books
Egyptian papyri